Juuso Salmi (born July 15, 1991) is a Finnish ice hockey defenceman who is currently playing for the HIFK Helsinki of the SM-liiga.

Playing career 
He played his first game for HIFK against Tappara.

References

External links 

1991 births
Living people
Finnish ice hockey defencemen
HIFK (ice hockey) players
Ice hockey people from Helsinki